Semiricinula tissoti is a species of sea snail, a marine gastropod mollusk, in the family Muricidae, the murex snails or rock snails.

Description
The length of the shell attains 18.5 mm.

Distribution
This marine species occurs off Mumbai, India.

References

 Petit de la Saussaye, S., 1852. Description de coquilles nouvelles. Journal de Conchyliologie 3: 162-165
 Fischer-Piette, E., 1950. Listes des types décrits dans le Journal de Conchyliologie et conservés dans la collection de ce journal. Journal de Conchyliologie 90: 8-23
 Tong, K.Y.L. (1986) The population dynamics and feeding ecology of Thais clavigera (Kuster) and Morula musiva (Kiener) (mollusca: gastropoda: muricidae) in Hong Kong. MPhil thesis. The University of Hong Kong
 Claremont M., Vermeij G.J., Williams S.T. & Reid D.G. (2013) Global phylogeny and new classification of the Rapaninae (Gastropoda: Muricidae), dominant molluscan predators on tropical rocky seashores. Molecular Phylogenetics and Evolution 66: 91–102.

tissoti
Gastropods described in 1852